El Michels Affair is an American "cinematic soul" group led by New York-based musician Leon Michels. The group released its debut album Sounding Out the City in 2005. After touring behind Raekwon and other Wu-Tang Clan members, the group recorded the popular cover album Enter the 37th Chamber in 2009. After releasing other cover albums during the following decade, El Michels Affair released the original albums Adult Themes in 2020 and Yeti Season in 2021.

History 
Michels played with Soul Fire Records house band The Mighty Imperials before forming his own ensemble in 2002. This group released singles for Soul Fire and for Misty, a sublabel of Daptone Records, as well as a full-length album which was released on the Michels-cofounded label Truth & Soul Records in 2005. Titled Sounding Out the City, the album drew from library music and afrobeat influences. After performing with Raekwon at a concert, the group began working with other members of the Wu-Tang Clan and covered several of their songs for vinyl single releases. By 2009, this had yielded an album's worth of material, which was released in 2009 as Enter the 37th Chamber, the name is a play on the album Enter the Wu-Tang (36 Chambers). El Michels Affair followed this with a second album of arrangements of songs by Wu-Tang Clan and from its members' solo releases, titled Return to the 37th Chamber.

In 2019, they accompanied Freddie Gibbs and Madlib at their popular NPR Tiny Desk performance and later recorded The Diamond Mine Sessions with them.

El Michels Affair began the 2020s with new original material; they released their album Adult Themes in 2020 and followed it less than a year later with the Turkish pop and prog-inspired Yeti Season in March 2021; the album features vocals from Hindi language singer Piya Malik and The Shacks.

Personnel 

 Leon Michels – bandleader and producer, tenor saxophone, flute, keyboards, guitar, bass, percussion, engineering

Other contributors include:

 Homer Steinweiss – drums
 Nick Movshon – bass, drums, guitar
 Thomas Brenneck – guitar, bass
 Michael Leonhart – trumpet, brass 
 Toby Pazner – keyboards 
 Aaron Johnson – trombone
 Sean Solomon – guitar
 Dave Guy – trumpet
 Marco Benevento – keyboards

Discography

Studio albums

Tribute & remix albums

EPs

Singles

See also 

 Menahan Street Band

References

American funk musical groups
American soul musical groups
Musical groups from Brooklyn